Monica Proenca is a dance choreographer. She was born in Rio de Janeiro, Brazil, going on to graduate from the San Francisco School of the Arts in the United States. As a professional dancer Monica has worked with choreographers, both Classical and Contemporary.
She has taught and choreographed in Spain, USA, Germany, Japan and all over Brazil and Canada. Her choreography has been performed and awarded in more than 15 countries. She was a nominee for the 4th Annual Inspirational Latin American Awards for Arts and Culture (2015).

Monica recently choreographed Center Stage: On Pointe movie. produced by Sony Pictures the latest film of the successful series with stars such as Ethan Stiefel, Sascha Radestsky, Nicole Muñoz, Barton Cowperthwaite, Rachele Brooke Smith and Chloe Lukasiak. Monica currently calls Vancouver, Canada her home where she continues to choreograph, produce, dance and coach.

References

Living people
1972 births
Brazilian female dancers
Brazilian expatriates in the United States